Dragon is Jake Shimabukuro's fourth U.S. solo album. It was released in October 2005.

The album peaked at #5 on Billboard'''s Top World Music Albums in 2005.Dragon – Awards on AllMusic It garnered Shimabukuro the Favorite Entertainer of the Year award at the 2006 Na Hoku Hanohano Awards, and Best Rock Album at the 2006 Hawaii Music Awards.

The AllMusic review summarized Dragon'' by saying, "Aside from his versatile playing, the collection's strength lies in its unpredictability from track to track. ... You can feel the island breezes here and there, but Shimabukuro's approach to his native instrument is equally at home on the gritty streets of Manhattan."

Track listing
All tracks composed by Jake Shimabukuro except where noted.

"Shake It Up!" – 2:59 
"Dragon" – 4:06
"Circle of Friends" – 3:15 
"Me and Shirley T." – 3:39
"Floaters" – 2:21
"3rd Stream" – 5:08 
"Touch" – 3:34
"En Aranjuez Con Tu Amor" (Joaquín Rodrigo) – 5:03
"Toastmanland" – 3:35 
"Making A Perfect Yesterday" – 2:24
"Looking Back" – 5:19
"With U Always" – 3:45

Personnel
Judy Barrett – violin
Karen Bechtel – cello, string quartet
Matt Catingub – conductor, string arrangements, string conductor
Karen Fujimoto – cello
Claire Hazzard – violin, string quartet
Ignace Jang – violin
Hideo Oida – photography
Noel Okimoto – drums, rhythm arrangements
Daniel Pardo - flute
Takaoki Saito – engineer, mixing
Jake Shimabukuro – acoustic guitar, piano, electric guitar, keyboards, programming, ukulele, producer, liner notes, rhythm arrangements, drum loop
Dean Taba – bass, rhythm arrangements
Preston Terada – graphic design
Anna Womack – viola, string quartet
Sandra Wong – viola
Hung Wu – violin, string quartet

Charts

References

External links
Dragon at AllMusic
Dragon at Amazon
Biography of Jake Shimabukuro at Billboard

2005 albums
Jake Shimabukuro albums